Marcelo Daniel Bauza (born Argentina) is a retired Argentine football (soccer) player, who  played as a defender. His son, Juan Bauza is also a footballer.

References

External links
 

1965 births
Living people
Argentine footballers
Argentine expatriate footballers
Expatriate footballers in Bolivia
Expatriate footballers in El Salvador
C.D. FAS footballers
Alianza F.C. footballers
Association football midfielders